Within the field of astronomy, Magnetic midnight is the time of day when the North or South Magnetic Pole is exactly in between the sun and an observer on earth's surface. This is the best time for observing auroras.

Because Earth's magnetic poles do not coincide with its geographical poles—the angle between Earth's rotation axis and magnetic axis is about 11°—magnetic midnight differs from conventional midnight. In most of the United States, magnetic midnight occurs about an hour earlier.

References

Night